

The Camair Twin Navion was a civil utility aircraft produced in the United States in the 1950s by converting single-engine Ryan Navions to twin-engine power. It had been one of two programs to improve the performance of the otherwise-pleasing Navion that was generally considered to be underpowered. The other program had resulted in the TEMCO-Riley D-16A Twin Navion. The Twin Navion design had been undertaken by the White brothers of White Engineering in San Antonio, Texas. They replaced the Navion's engine with a baggage compartment, mounted two engines within new nacelles attached to the wing leading edges, fitted the aircraft with a new tail fin made of fiberglass, and added tip tanks made from recycled WWII napalm canisters. Designated the WE-1, the prototype and the rights were sold to Camair soon after its first flight in 1953 and Civil Aviation Authority type certification was achieved in May 1955 under the name Camair 480.  Sales were slow and Camair built only 25 examples before selling off the rights in 1959. The ownership of these rights would change hands twice again over the following decade but only another eight aircraft would be built after the end of Camair's involvement

Specifications (480)

See also

References

  
 
 
 twinnavion.com

1950s United States civil utility aircraft
Low-wing aircraft
Aircraft first flown in 1953
Twin piston-engined tractor aircraft